Rahel Tewelde (born 1974) is an Eritrean filmmaker.

Rahel Tewelde studied in Asmara. Her first film Hid'get was screened on Eritrean television. Tewelde has also translated the film Casablanca into Tigrinya.

Films
 Hid'get [Forgiveness], 2003
 Shikorinatat [The Beautiful Ones], 2006.

References

1974 births
Living people
Eritrean film directors
Eritrean translators